The 2018–19 World Boxing Super Series – Super lightweight division is a World Boxing Super Series professional boxing tournament that took place between October 2018 and October 2019 in several countries. The Super Series features eight top-rated super lightweight boxers in a single-elimination tournament. The tournament was organized by Comosa AG.

Participants 

 Viktor Postol and Subriel Matías are tournament reserve fighters.

Brackets

Quarter-finals 
The quarterfinals were held between 7 October and 3 November 2018.

Semi-finals 
The semifinals will be held in 27 April and 18 May 2019.

Final 
For the WBA (Super), IBF and The Ring titles.

References 

World Boxing Super Series
World Boxing Super Series
World Boxing Super Series